Franklin Pierce Stoy (January 23, 1853 – July 22, 1911) was the Mayor of Atlantic City, New Jersey from 1894–1897 and again from 1900 to 1911. Stoy became a Councilman at Large of the local government in 1891 and, three years later, was elected chief executive. Known as the "Dandy Mayor," he died of neuritis on July 22, 1911.

References

1854 births
1911 deaths
Mayors of Atlantic City, New Jersey
19th-century American politicians